ISO 3166-2:CR is the entry for Costa Rica in ISO 3166-2, part of the ISO 3166 standard published by the International Organization for Standardization (ISO), which defines codes for the names of the principal subdivisions (e.g., provinces or states) of all countries coded in ISO 3166-1.

Currently for Costa Rica, ISO 3166-2 codes are defined for 7 provinces.

Each code consists of two parts, separated by a hyphen. The second part is one or two letters.

Current codes
Subdivision names are listed as in the ISO 3166-2 standard published by the ISO 3166 Maintenance Agency (ISO 3166/MA).

See also
 Subdivisions of Costa Rica
 FIPS region codes of Costa Rica

External links
 ISO Online Browsing Platform: CR
 Provinces of Costa Rica, Statoids.com

2:CR
ISO 3166-2
Costa Rica geography-related lists